Turun Pallokerho (or TPK) is an association football club from Turku, Finland currently playing in the Finnish fourth tier Kolmonen. TPK has played two seasons in the Finnish premier division Mestaruussarja in 1951 and 1952, finishing third in 1951.

TPK is the first youth club of the Finland national football team goalkeeper Lukáš Hrádecký.

Season to Season 

2 seasons in Mestaruussarja
10 seasons in Suomensarja
21 seasons in Kakkonen
22 seasons in Kolmonen
13 seasons in Nelonen
2 seasons in V Divisioona

References 

Football clubs in Finland
Association football clubs established in 1935
Sport in Turku
1935 establishments in Finland